Homoeodera edithia, the Edith's fungus weevil is a species of beetle belonging to the family Anthribidae. The species is endemic to Saint Helena.

References

Beetles described in 1877
Anthribidae